McNish is a surname. Notable people with the surname include:

Allan McNish (born 1969), racing driver
Althea McNish, British textile designer from Trinidad
Callum McNish (born 1992), English footballer
Cliff McNish, fantasy author for young adults
Harry McNish (1874–1930), the carpenter on Sir Ernest Shackleton's Imperial Trans-Antarctic Expedition of 1914–1917
Ryan McNish (born 1981), lacrosse player for the Edmonton Rush in the National Lacrosse League

See also
 Macnish, surname
 McNish Island, the larger of two islands lying at the east side of Cheapman Bay on the south side of South Georgia